Soul Song is an album by organist Shirley Scott recorded in 1968 and released on the Atlantic label.

Reception
The Allmusic site awarded the album 2 stars stating "This collector's item has its interesting moments, but it is one of Shirley Scott's less significant dates".

Track listing 
 "Think" (Lowman Pauling) - 8:06     
 "When a Man Loves a Woman" (Calvin Lewis, Andrew Wright) - 6:59     
 "Mr. Businessman" (Ray Stevens) - 3:12     
 "Blowin' in the Wind" (Bob Dylan) - 6:24     
 "Soul Song" (Shirley Scott) - 5:30     
 "Like a Lover" (Marilyn Bergman, Alan Bergman, Dori Caymmi, Nelson Motta) - 4:03  

Personnel 
 Shirley Scott - organ
 Stanley Turrentine - tenor saxophone (tracks 1-5)
 Eric Gale - guitar (tracks 1, 2, 5 & 6)
 Bob Cranshaw (tracks 3 & 4), Roland Martinez (tracks 2 & 5), - electric bass
 Ray Lucas (tracks 3 & 4), Specs Powell (tracks 1 & 6), Bernard Purdie (tracks 2 & 5) - drums

References 

1968 albums
Albums produced by Joel Dorn
Atlantic Records albums
Shirley Scott albums